Aeroflot Flight 2306 was a scheduled domestic passenger flight from Vorkuta to Moscow in the Soviet Union, with a stopover in Syktyvkar. The Tupolev Tu-134 operated by Aeroflot crashed on 2 July 1986 during an emergency landing after it departed Syktyvkar, killing 54 of 92 passengers and crew on board.

Aircraft
The aircraft was a Tupolev Tu-134AK, manufactured in 1978 and registered as CCCP-65120 to the Komi Civil Aviation department of Aeroflot. At the time of the crash the aircraft had sustained 7,989 pressurization cycles and 13,988 flight hours.

Crew 
Six crew members were aboard the flight. The cockpit crew consisted of the following:
 Captain V. Dubrovsky
 Co-pilot D. Kuleshov 
 Flight engineer S. Shamyrkanov
 Navigator Y. Dmitriev
Two flight attendants were present in the cabin.

Accident
All passenger baggage from Vorkuta was loaded into the rear luggage compartment, but no search of the luggage contents was carried out, which was allowed by aviation guidelines at the time. The first phase of the route was carried out without any issues on board. After the aircraft landed in Syktyvkar five additional passengers boarded the aircraft, which included two Bulgarian loggers.

The flight departed from Syktyvkar at 09:55 Moscow time with 86 passengers aboard, including 19 children. The captain sent the flight engineer to verify the alert. The flight engineer confirmed that there was indeed a fire in the rear cargo hold where passenger baggage was stored, giving off excessive smoke. Doubting if the information he received from the flight engineer was correct the captain left the cockpit to investigate the situation with the flight engineer, in violation of established procedures. The captain then delegated the co-pilot and flight engineer to put out the fire while he and the navigator remained in the cockpit to initiate an emergency descent. The flight engineer and the first officer fought the fire while the captain and navigator initiated an immediate descent and turn in the direction go Syktyvkar in preparation for an emergency landing. At 10:11:11 he informed the air traffic controller about the onboard fire.

At an altitude of  the landing gear was released. When the aircraft was at an altitude of  the flight engineer and the first officer returned to the cockpit and announced that the fire had not been extinguished, although two of the four fire extinguishers had been deployed. The two officers had attempted to reach the rear cargo compartment but because the smoke and fumes were so intense they quickly became disoriented and did not discharge the fire extinguishers in the correct location. Neither the co-pilot nor the flight engineer used oxygen masks or wore a smokehood. The amount of smoke in the cabin was intensified in part by the engines not working on full power, hence the cabin ventilation was impaired.

There was a possibility that due to abnormally low altitude relative to the distance from the airport the crew was not able to detect signals from the airport's radio navigation equipment. Under the circumstances of not being able to make an emergency landing at the airport immediately, the captain opted to make a forced landing outside of the airport and informed air traffic control of his decision. Radio communication was also interrupted, but communication between air traffic control and the aircraft was already conducted at that time through the aircraft's radio repeater. The smoke in the aircraft cabin induced coughing, suffocation and bleeding from the nasopharynx. The fumes of the various combustion products from the fire led some of the passengers to faint. The crew did not set the air conditioning to correspond with the current engine mode, but doing so would have had little change in the cabin air.

In the course of nine minutes the crew tried to find a place to land. Because visibility was limited to 6 kilometers and the aircraft was at a low altitude, the flight failed to find anywhere appropriate to land, the captain was forced to land directly in the forest directly below, and did not have time to prepare the passengers for an emergency evacuation. In violation of the aircraft flight manual, the navigator left his station at the time of the landing. Both wings were torn off the aircraft and the fuselage broke into three parts. A secondary fire broke out from fuel leaking after the tanks were damaged in the crash, destroying much of what remained of the aircraft.

Passengers were speedily evacuated from the wreckage through the front luggage compartment, doors in the cabin, and breaks in fuselage. The cockpit door was jammed from the accident so the flight attendants helped the captain and flight engineer get out of the cockpit, but the navigator was killed in the accident and the flight engineer died of his injuries soon after getting out of the wreckage. At 13:35 the wreckage was spotted by a helicopter and 19 hours later all of the survivors were rescued from the scene. 54 of the 86 passengers died in the accident, including seven children. Forensic examination of the bodies of the deceased passengers showed that several of them had been killed by smoke inhalation and not the impact of the crash itself.

Investigation 
The fire on the ground after the plane crashed destroyed most of the aircraft to the point of making study of the remains nearly impossible. The investigation lasted five months, during which the chairman of the investigation commission was replaced before the full report was completed. The official conclusion was that a fire in the rear luggage compartment spread in across the compartment sections before the crew could begin to extinguish it. The attempts to extinguish the fire were unsuccessful, and the smoke and fumes from the fire spread into the cabin, the aircraft was forced to choose an emergency landing. However, due to low visibility, the distance from the airport, and the increasing amount of fumes in the cockpit, the aircraft was forced to make a landing in the forest below. The exact cause of the fire was not discovered, but it was suggested that an incendiary device or contraband flammable materials could have been in passenger baggage because the luggage was not inspected before the flight. The commission was able to exclude the possibility of leakage of hydraulic fluid or damage to the wiring in internal aircraft components causing a fire.

See also 
 Air Canada Flight 797
 ValuJet Flight 592
 Saudia Flight 163
 Swissair Flight 111

References

1986 in the Soviet Union
Accidents and incidents involving the Tupolev Tu-134
2306
Airliner accidents and incidents caused by in-flight fires
Aviation accidents and incidents in 1986
Aviation accidents and incidents in the Soviet Union
July 1986 events in Europe